Fox Lake is an unincorporated community in northern Alberta, Canada within the Fox Lake 162 Indian reserve. The reserve is surrounded by and independent from Mackenzie County.

Demographics 
The population of Fox Lake according to the Little Red River Cree Nation is 1,773.

See also 
List of communities in Alberta

References

External links 
Little Red River Cree Nation

Localities on Indian reserves in Alberta
Mackenzie County